Landis Homestead, also known as the Morris Jarrett Farm, is a historic home located near Tylersport in Salford Township, Montgomery County, Pennsylvania.  The main farm house was built in 1839, and is a -story, four bay by two bay, stucco over stone dwelling.  It has a medium pitched gable roof.  Also on the property is a contributing barn.

It was added to the National Register of Historic Places in 1973.

References

Houses on the National Register of Historic Places in Pennsylvania
Houses completed in 1839
Houses in Montgomery County, Pennsylvania
National Register of Historic Places in Montgomery County, Pennsylvania